The Fender Wide Range Humbucker is a humbucker guitar pickup, designed by Seth Lover for Fender in the early 1970s. This pickup was intended to break Fender's image as a "single coil guitar company", and to gain a foothold in the humbucker guitar market dominated by Gibson.

The pickups enjoyed some popularity, though Fender's single-coil pickups retained their widespread popularity. Original Wide Range pickups were available from 1971 and subsequently installed in the Deluxe, Custom and Thinline Telecasters as well as the Starcaster, ceasing production successively in 1979 when these models were discontinued. Fender Japan were the first to introduce a reissue in 1983, followed by the Made in Mexico version around 1998. The Wide Range Pickup found on American made Fender guitars is actually the Mexican-made model introduced in 1998. All reissues differed from the original Seth Lover design in both construction and sound until 2020 when Fender began manufacturing the pickup with the original materials again. The company also produced a variation of the pickup for bass guitar from 1971 to 1979.

Construction 
The Wide Range pickup was conceived to be sonically closer to Fender's single coil pickups than Gibson humbuckers. Fender's single coils use six magnetised pole pieces sitting vertically, while Gibson's humbuckers use a long bar magnet at the pickup's base with six metal slug pole pieces screwed vertically into a base plate. Fender could not, however, simply replace the Humbuckers slugs with screws. Due to the difficulty of machining alnico magnets into screw-type pole pieces, this concept called for the use of the more easily machinable CuNiFe (Copper/Nickel/Iron) rod magnets as pole pieces within the coil structures; functioning more like a regular single coil pickup than a Gibson humbucker. 

Because CuNiFe pole piece magnets produce less output than a standard humbucker's bar magnet and slugs, the wide range Humbucker requires more winds of wire to produce an output compatible to Standard Humbuckers. The pickup bobbins were wound with approximately 6200 to 6800 turns of 42 awg poly insulated copper wire around the pole-pieces. The Wide Range pickup has a DC resistance of around 10.6 kΩ. These extra winds mean the wide range Humbucker needs a larger casing than standard Humbuckers.

There are three reissues of the wide range pickup using two designs: one manufactured in Japan using ceramic magnets and one in Mexico using alnico. Despite an almost identical appearance to the original 1970s unit, both are regular Humbuckers in large cases; surrounded by wax to take up space and prevent resonant feedback.

The current Mexican reissues, much like a Gibson humbucker, feature a bar magnet underneath the bobbins that abuts to six screw type pole-pieces in each coil; they are simply conventional humbuckers placed in the larger "wide range" humbucker casing, and the gap is filled with wax. Although neither pickup precisely replicates the sound of the original, they are tonally similar. The Japanese reissue does, however, sound hotter and the Mexican reissue sounds more like a standard Gibson humbucker. A more recent reissue, currently exclusive to the Lee Ranaldo signature Jazzmaster, has been "re-voiced" to Ranaldo's specifications, but appears to be constructed similarly to the Mexican reissue.

In the 1970s, the Fender Wide Range was wired using 1M audio volume and tone pots. Using 1M pots resulted in an open and bright sound. Modern reissues are commonly wired using 250K volume and tone pots, resulting in a more choked and muddy sound; cutting high frequencies to ground.

In 2020, Fender began producing Wide Range pickups with Cunife magnets for the first time since the 1970s.

Sound 
Original Wide Range pickups are described as sounding "fat" but with improved clarity and detail over Gibson humbuckers. Combined with a bridge single-coil pickup on a Telecaster, it produces a smooth and warm yet biting sound. Famous users include Keith Richards of The Rolling Stones, Graham Coxon of Blur, Wes Borland of Limp Bizkit/Black Light Burns, Rich Robinson of the Black Crowes, Ryan Adams, Win Butler of Arcade Fire, Alex Kapranos of Franz Ferdinand, Lúcio Maia of Nação Zumbi, Roy Buchanan, Billy Gibbons of ZZ Top, Thom Yorke of Radiohead, Felix Rodriguez from The Sounds, singer-songwriter Kim Ralls, Chris Shiflett of Foo Fighters, The Edge of U2, Jonny Buckland of Coldplay, Leo Nocentelli of The Meters and Tab Benoit as well as Lee Ranaldo of Sonic Youth's modified "Jazzblasters" which featured Wide Range pickups on modified Fender Jazzmaster guitars.

References

External links 

Guitar pickups
Fender Musical Instruments Corporation